Maria Vittoria Mezza (3 February 1926 – 24 February 2005) was an Italian socialist and feminist politician. 
She was elected as a member of the Italian Socialist Party and served as Undersecretary for Industry and Commerce.

References

1926 births
2005 deaths
Italian feminists
Italian socialists
Italian socialist feminists
Italian Socialist Party politicians